Bharati or Bharathi may refer to:

Hinduism
 Bharati, an epithet of the Hindu goddess of knowledge and music Saraswati
 Bharati, consort of Hindu wind god, Vayu

Given name
 Bharathi (Tamil actress) (born 1987), Indian film actress
 Bharathi Vishnuvardhan (born 1951), Indian actress who has performed in Tamil and Kannada languages
 Bharathiraja (born 1941), South Indian filmmaker
 Bharati Braille, a family of braille alphabets used in South Asia

Surname
 Agehananda Bharati (1923–1991), Austrian academic and Hindu monk
 Gopalakrishna Bharati (1811–1896), Tamil poet and composer
 Subramania Bharati (1882–1921), Indian Nationalist poet and revolutionary, also referred to as Bharathi

Other uses
 Bharathi (1948 film), an Indian Kannada film
 Barati (1954 film), 1954 Indian film
 Bharathi (2000 film), a 2000 Indian Tamil-language film starring Sayaji Shinde, Devayani and Nizhalgal Ravi
 Bharati (research station), Indian research station in Antarctica
 Bharati script is a constructed script, proposed as a common or link script for Indian languages

See also
 Bharat (disambiguation)
 Barati (disambiguation)
 Bharti (disambiguation)